Al-Kateb House located in Taif, Saudi Arabia. It includes a number of Islamic decorations and Roman pillars. It was built in 1897–1898 by Mohamed bin Abdul Wahed, special clerk (kateb) of Awn ar-Rafiq. King Faisal, when serving as a viceroy in Hijaz lived at this palace, named at that time Kasr Al Nyaba. Prince Bandar bin Mohamed bin Abdulaziz Al Saud has also been in that palace. The palace has been abandoned since 1968–1969.

External links
 اختيار «بيت الكاتب» مقراً لمركز تاريخ الطائف

Buildings and structures in Saudi Arabia